Clovis Transit is the public transportation agency which provides fixed intra-city routes (branded Clovis Transit Stageline) and dial-a-ride service (as Clovis Transit Round Up) for Clovis, the second-largest city in Fresno County, California after the neighboring city and county seat, Fresno. Public transportation in Clovis was provided by Fresno Area Express (FAX) until 1979–80, when Clovis began developing its own transportation services. Stageline riders can transfer to FAX, which provides service connecting to Fresno.

History 
Public transportation service in Clovis was provided by a mixture of fixed routes from FAX and a dial-a-ride service, Round Up, which started in January 1979, funded by a grant from the Older Americans Act.

The Stageline service started as demand-responsive transportation in July 1980, replacing fixed routes formerly provided by FAX. In August 1990, Stageline was converted to a fixed route service under a contracted operator, and in September 1999, the City of Clovis took over Stageline operations.

Services 
Stageline operates two primary fixed routes (10 and 50) from Monday through Saturday; in addition, Stageline operates two "Education Center Express" routes (70 and 80) with one round-trip each per weekday. 

Round Up demand-responsive service operates from Monday through Saturday, and also operates on Sunday within Clovis city limits only. In addition, the "Clovis Old Town Trolley", a bus styled to resemble a streetcar, is available for charter through the City of Clovis.

Stageline route 50 also offers service to residents of the Tarpey Village, an unincorporated county island, through a reimbursement agreement with the County of Fresno. Similarly, the City of Clovis has a reimbursement agreement with the City of Fresno to extend some Fresno Area Express routes into Clovis (see § Transfers below).

Fares 
In October 2020, the Clovis City Council unanimously voted to remove fares from Stageline and Round Up, with the cost of transit services being covered by grants. The city had previously experimented with a free fare model in 2019.

Transfers 
Stageline service connects to Fresno Area Express. Stageline 10 connects to FAX routes 9 and 38 at Shaw and Cedar near Fresno State University and route 3 at Willow and Herndon. Stageline 50 connects to FAX route 9 at the Sierra Vista Mall along Shaw, route 28 at the Fresno County Clovis Campus (Peach and Dakota), and route 45 at Villa and Ashlan and again at Clovis and Ashlan.

Fleet 
Stageline uses 13 buses equipped with lifts; Round Up uses 17 buses with lifts and 3 passenger vans.

References

External links 

 

Public transportation in the San Joaquin Valley Area
Bus transportation in California
Public transportation in Fresno County, California
Transit agencies in California